The Macrocephalini are a tribe of ambush bugs, which are a subfamily (Phymatinae) of the assassin bug family (Reduviidae).

They have a largely tropical distribution.

Selected genera
 Extraneza
 Eurymnus Bergroth, 1917
 Goellneriana van Doesburg, 2004
 Glossopelta Handlirsch, 1897
 Macrocephalus
 Metagreuocoris Villiers, 1965
 Narina Distant, 1906
 Oxythyreus Westwood, 1841
 Parabotha Kormilev, 1984
 Paragreuocoris Carayon, 1949

References 

Reduviidae
Hemiptera tribes